Nora Cleary (1924-1988) was a well known Irish traditional singer and lilter from the hamlet "The Hand", near Milltown Malbay, County Clare, Ireland.

Nora Cleary was the second youngest child of Daniel and Catherina Cleary. With the exception of short periods in Clounlaheen and Manchester, she lived her whole life in The Hand. Her parents were already into music and stimulated her to sing. Further stimulus she received from her teachers at Shanaway National School. On a relatively young age she started singing in McCarthy 's Pub - still existing - in Clounlaheen, something she kept doing all her life. She died after a short illness.

Discography
Recordings of Nora Cleary are issued on several albums:

 The Lambs on the Green Hills, Songs of County Clare; 1978, Topic Records
 Voice of the People, Vol. 6: O'Er His Grave the Grass Grew Green; 1999, Topic Records 
 Voice of the People, Vol. 7: First I'm Going to Sing You a Ditty; 1999, Topic Records
 We've Received Orders to Sail; 1999, Topic Records
 Around the Hills of Clare; 2004, Musical Traditions Records Singing and lilting.

References

External links
 Clip of two songs by Nora Cleary
 Photo of Nora Cleary and Tom Munnelly

1924 births
1988 deaths
Musicians from County Clare
Irish folk singers
20th-century Irish women singers
People from Milltown Malbay